Madeleine Hutin, taking the name Little Sister Magdeleine of Jesus  (26 April 1898–6 November 1989), founded a Roman Catholic community of religious sisters, the Little Sisters of Jesus, on 8 September 1939 in Touggourt, French Algeria. She was inspired by the life and writings of Charles de Foucauld (also known as Father de Foucauld or Brother Charles of Jesus).

Little Sister Magdeleine began by sharing the life of semi-nomads on the outskirts of a Saharan oasis. Little Sisters of Jesus now live in sixty-three countries throughout the world.

Pope Francis named her as Venerable on 13 October 2021.

Early life
Élisabeth Marie Magdeleine Hutin was born in Paris on 26 April 1898. Her family came from  Lorraine. Magdeleine was the youngest of 6 children. Already as a young child, when on holidays with her grandmother in Seuzey, only 30 miles from the German border, she experienced the growing tensions between France and Germany. She thought of religious life from an early age and was always very attentive to those she saw to be less fortunate than herself. Through her father she learnt to have a great love for Africa and for the Arab world. As a young army doctor in Tunisia, injured in a fall from a horse, he nevertheless jeopardized both his health and his career by riding fifty kilometers to collect some serum to save the life of a small Arab child ill with diphtheria. The effort left him disabled and forced him to retire, but he never regretted what he had done.

She enrolled at a boarding school run by the religious of the Sacred Heart, but in 1907 the French government closed all religious schools and the Sacred Heart Sisters transferred their students elsewhere. Magdeleine wound up in a boarding school in San Sebastián, Spain, and later in San Remo, Italy.

She was 16 when the 1914–1918 war broke out, and the family took refuge in Aix-en-Provence. Seuzey was destroyed by the German army and when her grandmother refused to leave her home, she was shot. Her two brothers died in the battle in 1916 and her sister died of Spanish flu. Magdeleine herself contracted pleurisy, complicated by tuberculosis.

With her father Madeleine discovered the life of Father de Foucauld written by René Bazin in 1921. "Brother Charles represented for me what it means to live the Gospel. In embracing absolute poverty and in abandoning himself to the utterly abandoned, he lived the fullness of love." Reading the life of Charles de Foucald, who died without a follower, Madeleine was convinced that God was calling her to become one of the "little sisters" that Charles de Foucauld so longed for.

Her father died suddenly and Madeleine, who was 21, could not leave her mother. She would still have to wait to be able to leave for the Sahara to follow in the footsteps of Charles de Foucauld. Meanwhile, she worked in Nantes for eight years as headmistress of the Sacred Heart Convent School. Although she suffered from deforming arthritis she was determined to pursue her goal. For her Jesus was the "Master of the Impossible". Any treatment she followed made no difference and in despair a specialist encouraged her to leave and go to live in a completely dry climate: "like the Sahara", he added. Never could she have dreamt of receiving such advice. She had waited 20 years to go to the Sahara. It was clear to her that God was leading her life: ‘God took me by the hand and blindly I followed.’

Algiers
She left for Algiers on 6 October 1936 with her elderly mother and Anne, a young woman who shared her desire to go and live in the Sahara. On her arrival in Algiers, a priest asked her to help him open a social centre in Boghari, a village situated in the High Plateaux. Madeleine and her friend organized a soup kitchen and cared for the sick. They sought out the poorest nomads in the desert riding their mare Zerga. So much activity however left Madeleine dissatisfied: "We lead a busy life in Boghari. The demands made by our work were beginning to overwhelm us. There was no time for prayer and recollection. Like Brother Charles, I had hoped to lead a contemplative life among the Muslim people."

In El Golea, during a pilgrimage to the tomb of Father de Foucauld, Madeleine met there for the first time Father René Voillaume, disciple of Brother Charles, with whom she would collaborate to the end of her life. He was a founder of the Little Brothers of Jesus. Her desire for religious life never left her but it was Bishop Nouet of the Sahara who asked her if she wanted to stay in Algeria, to do a year's novitiate with the Missionary Sisters of Our Lady of Africa (White Sisters), and to become a religious. He also asked her to write the rule for the Little Sisters of Jesus.

Foundation of Little Sisters of Jesus
Magdeleine made her religious profession on 8 September 1939 under the name of Little Sister Magdeleine of Jesus. In October she went to live in the midst of nomads on the periphery of Touggourt, an oasis 700 km to the south of Algiers. Situated near an artesian well, Sidi Boujnan was the meeting place for the nomads of the region. For six months she lived in a tent and made friends with the nomads in the neighbouring tents. With their help, she rehabilitated an old house abandoned by the military which would become the first community house of the Little Sisters.

With the outbreak of World War II, Little Sister Magdeleine returned to Europe. She traveled throughout France, giving more than 600 conferences to speak of the message of Charles de Foucauld, to make known this new form of religious life lived in Muslim lands, and to seek funds for the construction of the house in Sidi Boujnan. Soon other young women were interested in joining the Congregation and in August, 1941, the first novices moved into a house called "the Tubet" near Aix-en-Provence. In 1944 Magdeleine was nearly executed in Grenoble by French military who mistook her for a spy disguised as a religious. As a recompense they gave her passage in a military plane to Rome. Private audience with Pius XII who confirmed her intuitions and encouraged her for the future.

1945 Return to Touggourt: Building and repair work to the house by the friends had never stopped. The Infant Jesus was given the place of honour.

1945 Little Sisters Magdeleine wrote ‘the Green Booklet’ describing the way of life of the Little Sisters. A chapter on the Infant Jesus of the Manger and the Virgin Mary, his Mother, was added in 1951. She renewed contact and confided in Father Voillaume for the formation of the Little Sisters. Foundation of a community for formation at El Abiodh, Algeria, near the community of the Little Brothers.

1945 Bishop de Provenchères was named Bishop of Aix-en-Provence and he gave all his support to this new form of religious life.

1946–1952 Development of the community and the setting in place of basic intuitions
1946 Decision to extend the communities of the Little Sisters of Jesus to every country, idea born while on retreat at La Sainte Bauume in France.

1946 Recognition of the Little Sisters of Jesus as a diocesan Congregation.

1946–1947 The first Communities involved in outside paid jobs: In 1946 two Little sisters were employed at Zenith light bulb factory in Aix-en-Provence. In 1947 Little sister Magdeleine worked in a pharmaceutical factory making tablets in Marseilles and, in 1947 in Algiers, in a metal box factory.

1948 Foundations in the Middle East, inspired by her search to be among Arab Christians and enable the Communities to belong to the different Oriental Rites.

1949 Pilgrimage to Béni Abbès with four Little sisters where they met Mohammed, Charles de Foucauld's companion, who looked after the hermitage of Charles de Foucauld.
Birth of the idea of Communities centred on Adoration.

1949 Bishop de Provenchères encouraged all Little Sister Magdeleine's plans to become: a worker among workers, a gypsy among gypsies, by a sharing of life through friendship. First community among 'gypsies' living with them in a caravan.

1949 In Bethlehem, Little sister Jeanne accepted to become General Sister in charge. Little Sister Magdeleine remained foundress and mother and was free to continue to prepare future foundations. Spiritual childhood became the hallmark of the Little Sisters.

1950 Pilgrimage to Tamanrasset, Hoggar, where Charles de Foucauld had lived and to the Assekrem.

1950 First Tent community in El Abiodh.

1950 Journey to the Camerouns, across the desert, to prepare future foundations.

1951–1953 spreading of the communities
1951 First Foundation in a poor district of Rome at the Borgata Prenistina. As well as scattered around the world,  Little sister Magdeleine wanted a community nearby the centre of the Church.
Foundations in Switzerland, Brazil, Morocco, the Middle East, Central Africa, India and Indochina. By 1953 there are 100 communities with 300 little Sisters.

1953–1954 journey round the world, crossing five continents in one year
From Niger to Camerouns, East Africa, South Africa and West Africa. By boat to South America and Mexico. On towards Martinique, Cuba, Haiti, North America up to Alaska. From there to Asia: Japan, Korea, Taiwan, Hong Kong and Indochina. On to Australia, Papua New Guinea, Indonesia, Sri Lanka, India, Pakistan, Afghanistan, Iran and Turkey.

1956–1957 journeys into Eastern Europe building friendship and preparing future foundations
1956 Little Sister Magdeleine in her van "the Shooting Star" crossed into Yugoslavia, Hungary and Czechoslovakia. First communities were set up in Poland. When on the roads of Eastern Europe she would carry her work on the Constitutions, wrapped in a red scarf which she called ‘the Mother House’.

1957 Little Sister Magdeleine decided to stay in Eastern Europe but unforeseen circumstances obliged her to return among the Little Sisters in the West.

1956–1959 Tre Fontane
1956 Don Sortais, the General of the Trappists of Tre Fontane, Rome, welcomed the Little Sisters to build what would become their Generalate. Seminarians from the Roman Colleges helped with the work.

1960 The Apostolic Visit
Throughout 1960, an Apostolic Visitor closely examined the progress of the congregation.

1961 On the first day of the week of prayer for Christian unity, the Visit ended. Little Sister Magdeleine was confirmed in her role as foundress and mother of the Little Sisters.

1962–1965 The General house in Rome
The Second Vatican Council brought bishops from all over the world together and many visited Tre Fontane.

1964 The Little Sisters of Jesus were recognized as being of Pontifical right and Tre Fontane became officially the Generalate.

Opening of a house for parents of the Little Sisters in Tre Fontane.

1964–1972 projects
1964 In Soviet Russia for the first time

Creation of special groups of communities: among nomads, fairground workers, gypsies, in circuses also among the sick, prisoners and victims of prostitution and drugs.

1967 Touggourt, returning to North Africa after many years to see friends of the foundation days in El Abiodh and Touggourt.

1967 El Golea, on pilgrimage to the tomb of Charles de Foucauld.

1971 Decision to open the community to welcome women from other Churches.

1971 Project for a community among "the hippies".

1972 Little Sister Magdeleine visited Ireland and England.

1972–1980 special visits to Tre Fontane
1973 Paul VI's surprise visit to Tre Fontane.

1985 John Paul II visited as pope. He had visited many times when bishop.

1971 Welcome of The Salvation Army.

1972 Brother Roger of the Taizé Community.

1972 Jean Vanier and pilgrims from L'Arche.

1974 Don Helder Camara of Brazil.

1975 Mother Teresa of Calcutta.

1977 Cardinal Can of Hanoi.

1978 Metropolitan Nikodim of Leningrad.

1979–1988 last years
1979 Journey to the People's Republic of China.

1980 Visit of Metropolitan Batholomew, the present Patriarch of Constantinople.

984 Death of Bishop de Provenchères in the Tubet.

1988 Definitive approval of the Constitutions

1989 Chiara Lubich, who founded the Focolare Movement, visited Tre Fontane.

1989 Last visit to Russia three months before her death. Meeting with Fr Alexander Men from Russia in Moscow.

1989 Celebration of the Fifty Years Anniversary since the Foundation of the Little Sisters of Jesus in the Tubet.

1989 Little Sister Magdeleine's death
Little Sister Magdeleine died on the 6 November 1989 at Tre Fontane, Rome, in the little room prepared for young people travelling the roads.

Her funeral and farewell Mass took place in Tre Fontane on the 10 November 1989, the day the Berlin wall crumbled.

References

Sources
Little Sister Magdeleine of Jesus (1981). He took me by the hand: The Little Sisters of Jesus following in the footsteps of Charles de Foucauld, New City.
Kathryn Spink (1993). The Call of the desert: A Biography of Little Sister Magdeleine of Jesus, Darton Longman & Todd.
Daiker, Angelika (2010). Beyond Borders : Life and Spirituality of Little Sister Magdalene, Makati City : St. Pauls, .
Little Sister Annie of Jesus, Preface by Jean Vanier (2010) Little Sister Magdeleine of Jesus: Message of Bethlehem to a Suffering World Claretian Publications. Original in French, translated by Little Sisters of Jesus.  No. of pages: 223.

External links
 The life and writings of Little Sister Magdeeline of Jesus
 Short biography, a time-line and photographs of the Life of Little Sister Magdeleine.
A list of books in English about Little Sister Magdeleine
  History of the Little Sisters of Jesus

1898 births
1989 deaths
Nuns from Paris
20th-century French nuns
Founders of Catholic religious communities
Catholic Church in Algeria
Little Brothers and Sisters of Charles de Foucauld
Servants of God
Venerated Catholics by Pope Francis